Ilyinka is a rural locality (a selo) and the administrative center of Ilyinsky Selsoviet, Shelabolikhinsky District, Altai Krai, Russia. The population was 654 as of 2013. There are 8 streets.

Geography 
Ilyinka is located 22 km northwest of Shelabolikha (the district's administrative centre) by road. Lugovoye is the nearest rural locality.

References 

Rural localities in Shelabolikhinsky District